Cestites ("girdle") is a controversial fossil from the Middle Ordovician (Darriwilian, 460 million years old) Douglas Lake Member of the Lenoir Limestone from Douglas Dam Tennessee. At first considered a ctenophore by Caster and Brooks, it was later interpreted as a genus of liverwort by Gregory Retallack.

Description
Cestites has a narrow gametophyte thallus, with a wide midrib and dichotomizing at long intervals. The archegoniophores are parasol shaped and clustered.

Interpretation
The liverwort interpretation of this fossil has been considered controversial in some quarters  but accepted elsewhere.

References

Fossils of Tennessee
Fossil record of plants
Ordovician plants
Marchantiales
Prehistoric plant genera
Liverwort genera